Roll Out the Red Carpet for Buck Owens and his Buckaroos (or simply Roll Out the Red Carpet) is an album by Buck Owens and his Buckaroos, released in 1966. It reached Number one on the Billboard Country charts and Number 106 on the Pop Albums charts.

It was re-released on CD in 1995 by Sundazed Records with two bonus tracks, both instrumental performances.

Reception

In his Allmusic review, critic Lindsay Planer wrote "The stability of the lineup as well as a few Buckaroo instrumentals and vocal duets—featuring lead Buckaroo and longtime Owens collaborator Don Rich—contribute to the power of this oft-overlooked effort. The increasingly subtle yet significant impact of rock & roll can be heard throughout Roll Out the Red Carpet."

Track listing
 "Gonna Roll Out the Red Carpet" (Buck Owens) – 2:11
 "He Don't Deserve You Anymore" (Artie Lang, Owens) – 2:57
 "Cajun Fiddle" (Owens, Don Rich) – 1:42 (Instrumental)
 "That's What I'm Like Without You" (Owens, Rich, Red Simpson) – 2:48
 "I'm Layin' It on the Line" (Rich) – 2:24
 "Hangin' on to What I Got" (Owens, Dusty Rhodes, Billye Spears) – 2:19
 "We Split the Blanket" (Owens, Simpson) – 2:01
 "Cinderella" (Buddy Mize) – 2:43
 "Tom Cattin'" (Tom Brumley) – 2:08
 "There Never Was a Fool" (Owens, Simpson) – 2:09
 "After You Leave Me" (Buck Owens, Bonnie Owens) – 2:24
 "(I'll Love You) Forever and Ever" (Owens) – 2:20
1995 bonus tracks:
 "Only You (Can Break My Heart)" (Owens) – 2:27 (Instrumental)
 "My Heart Skips a Beat" (Owens) – 2:24 (Instrumental)

Personnel
Buck Owens – guitar, vocals
Don Rich – guitar, fiddle, vocals, (lead vocal on "I'm Laying it On the Line")
Doyle Holly – guitar, vocals, (lead vocal on "After You Leave Me")
Tom Brumley – pedal steel guitar
Willie Cantu – drums
Bob Morris – bass
Donald Frost – bass
James Burton – guitar  
Jelly Sanders – guitar  
Red Simpson – guitar

References

1966 albums
Buck Owens albums
Capitol Records albums
Albums produced by Ken Nelson (United States record producer)

Albums recorded at Capitol Studios